Edward Maurice Kushner (July 19, 1912 – March 1, 1982) was a Canadian football player who played for the Winnipeg Blue Bombers. He won the Grey Cup with Winnipeg in 1935 and 1939. He married Winnifred Ellen Cunliffe in 1936 and was alter a Chief Petty Officer in the Canadian Navy. He died of motor neuron disease in 1982.

References

Canadian football guards
Canadian football people from Winnipeg
Players of Canadian football from Manitoba
Winnipeg Blue Bombers players
1912 births
1982 deaths